Chiayi County FC is a football club from Chinese Taipei, also called Taiwan or Republic of China. It is one of the main association football clubs in Chinese Taipei.

Football clubs in Taiwan